Alfred "Fredy" Bieler (April 18, 1923 – April 24, 2013) was an ice hockey player for the Swiss national team. He won a bronze medal at the 1948 Winter Olympics.

External links 
 Fredi Bieler im Alter von 90 Jahren gestorben. In: nachrichten.ch, April 24, 2013 (German)

References 

1923 births
2013 deaths
Ice hockey players at the 1948 Winter Olympics
Olympic bronze medalists for Switzerland
Olympic ice hockey players of Switzerland
Olympic medalists in ice hockey
Medalists at the 1948 Winter Olympics
Sportspeople from Graubünden